Colin Ralph Cramphorn CBE, QPM, DL, FRSA (1 April 1956 – 30 November 2006) was the Chief Constable of West Yorkshire Police from September 2002 to November 2006.

Colin Cramphorn was educated at Strode's Grammar School, Egham, before joining the Surrey Constabulary in 1975. In September 1981 he went as a Bramshill scholar to the Faculty of Law (as it then was), King's College London, to study for the LL.B., and successfully graduated in June 1984. In 1995 he was appointed an Assistant Chief Constable with West Mercia Constabulary.

In 1998 he moved to the Royal Ulster Constabulary and he was briefly Acting Chief Constable of the RUC's successor, the Police Service of Northern Ireland, prior to the appointment of Sir Hugh Orde in May 2002. Cramphorn continued as Orde's deputy until September 2002, when he was appointed Chief Constable of West Yorkshire Police.

Colin Cramphorn died of prostate cancer in November 2006 at the age of 50.

Affiliations

Cramphorn was a Fellow of the RSA and of the Chartered Management Institute, a member of the Institute of Business Ethics and the Centre for Crime and Justice Studies (formerly the Institute for the Study and Treatment of Delinquency), and an Associate of St George's House, Windsor.

He was also a patron of the Royal Manchester Children's Hospital Research Equipment Fund, a member of the Council of the Order of St John South and West Yorkshire, and a Vice-President of the Yorkshire Society.

Honours
In the 2004 New Year Honours, Cramphorn was awarded the Queen's Police Medal. In January 2006 he was appointed to serve as a Deputy Lieutenant for West Yorkshire. In the 2007 New Year Honours Cramphorn was awarded the CBE posthumously; he had accepted the nomination before his death from prostate cancer, and the award was retroactively dated 28 November 2006.

 He was made a Deputy Lieutenant for West Yorkshire (DL) in January 2006.
 He was a Fellow of the Royal Society of Arts (FRSA).

References

1956 births
2006 deaths
Alumni of King's College London
Associates of King's College London
Chief Constables of West Yorkshire Police
Royal Ulster Constabulary officers
Police Service of Northern Ireland officers
English recipients of the Queen's Police Medal
People from Surrey
Deputy Lieutenants of West Yorkshire
Commanders of the Order of the British Empire
Deaths from prostate cancer
Deaths from cancer in England
Place of birth missing
Place of death missing